173 and 176 Perry Street are a pair of high-rise residential buildings facing West Street in West Village, Manhattan, New York City. It was designed by Richard Meier & Partners, and are the first project undertaken by Meier in Manhattan, although they stand a short walk away from his 1970 renovation of the Westbeth Artists Community. Construction of the buildings began in 1997 and was completed in 2002.

Reporter Penelope Green of The New York Times referred to Meier's paired towers as "beauty queens". The third building in the assemblage, 165 Charles Street, to the south of the original two, was completed in 2004 and was also designed by Meier.

References
Notes

External links

Richard Meier buildings
Residential buildings completed in 2002
Apartment buildings in New York City
Residential buildings in Manhattan
Condominiums and housing cooperatives in Manhattan
West Village
2002 establishments in New York City